Littler Mendelson P.C. is a U.S.-based law firm that handles labor and employment litigation as well as global mobility and immigration issues. The firm has competencies in Mexico, Canada, Germany and Venezuela. The firm has offices in Colombia, Costa Rica, Peru, and Puerto Rico.

History and practice
The firm remained local to the Bay Area until the 1990s, when it expanded throughout the U.S. via mergers and acquisitions.

In 2010, the firm announced an international labor and employment law office in Caracas, Venezuela (this office subsequently joined Ius Laboris in 2012). The firm opened two offices in Mexico under the name Littler, De la Vega y Conde, S.C. In October 2013, Littler combined with two Latin American law firms, adding a presence in four additional countries in the Latin American region - Colombia, Costa Rica, El Salvador, and Panama, and creating a new entity named Littler Global.  The firm continued expanding through Littler Global, opening offices in Puerto Rico, the Dominican Republic, Honduras, Peru, and Guatemala.

The firm is the largest labor and employment law firm in the US, and received high rankings including diversity, working conditions for women, and innovation.

Littler, described by critics as a union-busting firm, is also the largest union avoidance firm in the US. It has counseled and defended companies including Starbucks, Amazon, Nissan, and Delta Airlines against employees trying to unionize.

Notable alumni
 Alan D. Cohn, former Assistant Secretary of the United States Department of Homeland Security
Melissa Lafsky, author and blogger
 Sonja Henning, WNBA player
 William Emanuel, National Labor Relations Board Member

References

External links
 

Law firms based in San Francisco
Law firms established in 1942
1942 establishments in California